The following list of protected areas of British Columbia includes all federally and provincially protected areas within the Canadian province of British Columbia. As of 2015, approximately 15.46% of the province's land area and 3.17% of the province's waters are protected.

International recognition

Three UNESCO World Heritage Sites are entirely or partially located in British Columbia: 
 Canadian Rocky Mountain Parks (shared with Alberta)
 Kluane / Wrangell–St. Elias / Glacier Bay / Tatshenshini-Alsek (shared with Yukon and Alaska, United States)
 SG̱ang Gwaay

Two UNESCO-MAB Biosphere Reserves are in British Columbia: 
Clayoquot Sound
Mount Arrowsmith

Federally protected areas

Parks Canada

Seven National Parks of Canada are located in British Columbia, more than any other province or territory:
Glacier National Park
Gulf Islands National Park Reserve
Gwaii Haanas National Park Reserve
Kootenay National Park
Mount Revelstoke National Park
Pacific Rim National Park Reserve
South Okanagan—Similkameen National Park Reserve (proposed)
Yoho National Park

One National Marine Conservation Area of Canada is located in British Columbia:
Gwaii Haanas Reserve
Southern Strait of Georgia Reserve (proposed)

There are numerous National Historic Sites of Canada in British Columbia, with 13 being operated by Parks Canada:

Chilkoot Trail
Fisgard Lighthouse
Fort Langley
Fort Rodd Hill
Fort St. James
Gitwangak Battle Hill
Gulf of Georgia Cannery
Kicking Horse Pass
Kootanae House
Nan Sdins
Rogers Pass
Stanley Park
Twin Falls Tea House

Canadian Wildlife Service

Six National Wildlife Areas of Canada are located in British Columbia:
 Alaksen
 Columbia
 Qualicum
 Scott Islands Marine
 Vaseux-Bighorn
 Widgeon Valley

Seven Migratory Bird Sanctuaries of Canada are located in British Columbia:
 Christie Islet
 Esquimalt Lagoon
 George C. Reifel
 Nechako River
 Shoal Harbour
 Vaseux Lake
 Victoria Harbour

Fisheries and Oceans Canada
Three Marine Protected Areas of Canada are located in British Columbia:
Endeavour Hydrothermal Vents
Hecate Strait and Queen Charlotte Sound Glass Sponge Reefs
SGaan Kinghlas-Bowie Seamount

Two Marine Refuges of Canada are located in British Columbia:
Offshore Pacific Seamounts and Vents
Strait of Georgia and Howe Sound Glass Sponge Reef

Provincially protected areas

BC Parks
A complete list of provincial parks and protected areas can be found in the list of British Columbia Provincial Parks.

Ministry of Forests, Lands, Natural Resource Operations and Rural Development
 
The British Columbia Ministry of Forests, Lands, Natural Resource Operations and Rural Development (FLNRORD) manages a system of 31 Wildlife Management Areas throughout the province:

See also
List of municipal and regional parks in British Columbia

References

External links
BC Parks - A complete list of BC Parks managed land.

 
 
Protected areas
British Columbia
Articles containing video clips